Saint-Ilpize is a commune in the Haute-Loire department in south-central France.

Population

The population data in the table and graph below refer to the commune of Saint-Ilpize in its geography at the given years. In 1845 the commune of Villeneuve-d'Allier was established from part of the commune of Saint-Ilpize.

See also
Communes of the Haute-Loire department

References

Communes of Haute-Loire